Valerie Agnew is best known as the drummer of 7 Year Bitch. Agnew moved from Ohio to Seattle, Washington, where she met the musicians that would become her future bandmates: Selene Vigil (vocals), Elizabeth Davis (bass), and Stefanie Sargent (lead guitar). They formed 7 Year Bitch and signed with C/Z Records. They released their debut album Sick 'Em in 1992.

While still living in Ohio, Agnew dated Steve Moriarty, the drummer for the American punk band the Gits. Additionally, Agnew was a very close friend of Mia Zapata, the band's frontwoman. In 1993, Zapata was brutally raped and murdered while walking home late at night.  In response, Agnew and 7 Year Bitch released the album ¡Viva Zapata!, dedicated to Zapata. The album also featured songs about former guitarist Stefanie Sargent, who died due to a drug overdose on June 27, 1992. In 1995, the band signed with Atlantic Records, and a year later released their final studio album, Gato Negro.  With the recent departure of their guitarist, Roisin Dunne, and the geographical separation between bandmates, 7 Year Bitch's career came to a close after a final tour with San Francisco's Lost Goat.

Discography

Albums
Sick 'Em (C/Z Records, 1992).
¡Viva Zapata! (C/Z Records, 1994).
Gato Negro (Atlantic Records, 1996).

Singles/EPs
"Lorna" b/w "No Fucking War," "You Smell Lonely" (Rathouse/Face The Music Records), (1991; reissued by C/Z Records in 1992).
"Antidisestablishmentarianism EP" (Rugger Bugger Records, 1992)
"7 Year Bitch" / "Thatcher on Acid" "Can We Laugh Now?" / "No Fucking War" (Clawfist Records, 1992)
"7 Year Bitch EP" (C/Z Records, 1992)
"Rock-A-Bye Baby" b/w "Wide Open Trap" (C/Z Records, 1994)
"The History of My Future" b/w "24,900 Miles Per Hour" (promo only) (Atlantic Records, 1996)
"24,900 Miles Per Hour" (promo only) (Atlantic Records, 1996)
"Miss Understood" b/w "Go!" (Man's Ruin, 1996)

Other contributions
 "8-Ball Deluxe" on Kill Rock Stars (Kill Rock Stars, Nov '12).
 "Dead Men Don't Rape" on There's A Dyke in the Pit (Outpunk/Harp Records, 1992).
 "The Scratch" on Power Flush: San Francisco, Seattle & You (Rathouse/Broken Rekids, 1993).
 "In Lust You Trust" on Rawk Atlas (promo only) (C/Z Records, 1993).
 "Dead Men Don't Rape" on Progression (Progression, 1994).
 "The Scratch," "Icy Blue" on the Mad Love Motion Picture Soundtrack (Zoo Records, 1995).
 "Kiss My Ass Goodbye" on Seattle Women in Rock: A Diverse Collection (Insight Records, 1995).
 "Damn Good And Well" on Space Mountain (Rough Trade Publishing, 1995).
 "The Scratch" on Take A Lick (promo only) (BMG, 1995).
 "M.I.A." on Notes From The Underground, Vol. 2 (Priority Records, 1995).
 "Mad Dash" on Home Alive: The Art Of Self-Defense (Epic Records, 1996).
 "24,900 Miles Per Hour" on huH Music Sampler No. 23 (promo only, RayGun Press, 1996).
 "Knot (Live)" on Hype! The Motion Picture Soundtrack (Sub Pop Records, 1996).
 "Damn Good And Well" on Rough Cuts: The Best Of Rough Trade Publishing, 1991–1995 (Rough Trade Publishing, 1997).
 "Rock-A-Bye Baby" on She's A Rebel (Beloved/Shanachie Records, 1997).
 "Shake Appeal" on We Will Fall: The Iggy Pop Tribute (Royalty Records, 1997).
 "M.I.A." on Whatever: The 90's Pop & Culture Box (Flying Rhino Records/WEA, 2005).
 "The Scratch" on Sleepless in Seattle: The Birth Of Grunge (LiveWire Recordings, 2006).

Music videos
"In Lust You Trust" (1992)
"Hip Like Junk" (1994)
"24,900 Miles Per Hour" (1996)

Filmography

Film
The Gits Movie (2005) Mad Love (1995 film)

References

American women drummers
Feminist musicians
1969 births
Living people
Musicians from Ohio
Place of birth missing (living people)
7 Year Bitch members
20th-century American drummers
20th-century American women musicians
20th-century American musicians
21st-century American women